Arenal del Sur is a town and municipality located in the Bolívar Department, northern Colombia.

References 

Municipalities of Bolívar Department